Kentucky Route 2698 is a state highway that begins at Keller Road via Rural Daviess County and Owensboro. Next to US 60, and Kentucky Route 81 in Owensboro.

Route Description
Kentucky Route 2698 (KY 2698) is a  mostly urban secondary highway that begins at Keller Road. The highway goes north along Carter Road making its way to the junction with KY 2121 (Southtown Boulevard). As then, the road makes its way to a non-signed road called Tamarack Road. At one of its main junctions, is U.S. Route 60 (US 60). Finally, The highway ends at KY 81.

Major intersections

References 

2698
Transportation in Daviess County, Kentucky